Marcella Arguello is an American comedian based in Los Angeles, California.

Early life

Arguello grew up in Modesto, California, where she was active in school theater. By her own description she was a class clown, known especially for her Michael Jackson impression. She attended Johansen High School, graduating in 2002. She attended California State University, Stanislaus and San Francisco State University for three years, intending to become an elementary schoolteacher, before moving to Los Angeles to pursue a career in comedy.

Her parents emigrated to the United States from El Salvador during the Salvadoran Civil War.

Career

She has worked at The Improv comedy clubs all over the U.S. and appears regularly at The Punch Line comedy clubs in Northern California. She has performed at The Ice House, The San Francisco Comedy Festival, Riot LA Comedy Festival, and for American troops overseas. She has opened for Hannibal Buress, Ron Funches, David Alan Grier, Norm Macdonald, Jessimae Peluso, J. B. Smoove, and many others. In 2009 she won the Modesto Area Music Award (MAMA) for best comedian.

In 2015 she made her national television debut, appearing on Last Call with Carson Daly. Since then she has appeared several times on the competitive improvisational comedy show @midnight, "winning the Internet" in March 2016 and again in Jan 2017. She was featured on the Viceland comedy series Flophouse, in which Lance Bangs follows the lives of up-and-coming comedians at underground stand-up events, and in The Makings of a Stand-Up Comedian, a 2014 documentary film. She has also been featured on The Nerdist Podcast, Funny or Die, and The Don Geronimo Show. Her Twitter account, @marcellacomedy, was named one of the "75 Best Twitter Accounts of 2015" by Paste magazine, and has been featured on TIME.com, Brightest Young Things, Comedy Central, CNN, and many entertainment websites.

Her subjects include race, gender, relationships, and family, among others. At six feet two inches tall, she also jokes about her height ("I love being a very tall woman until someone calls me 'sir' real loud in public"). She is also known for her "signature shock of curly hair". Her influences include Dave Attell, Dave Chappelle, Natasha Leggero, and others.

Arguello takes on hecklers at her live shows. When asked what the appropriate retribution for hecklers is, she answered "verbal annihilation." She also does impersonations of Michael Jackson and Mariah Carey.

References

External links 
 
 
 
 
 The Makings of a Stand-Up Comedian

American women comedians
American stand-up comedians
Living people
American people of Salvadoran descent
People from Modesto, California
Comedians from California
Year of birth missing (living people)
21st-century American women